Tulsi Giri (26 September 1926 – 18 December 2018) was the Prime Minister of Nepal from 1975 to 1977, and chairman of the Council of Ministers (a de facto Prime Ministerial position) in 1963, and again in 1964 and 1965. He was born in Siraha District, Nepal in 1926. Tulsi was a Minister in the Congress government of 1959−1960 before its dissolution by King Mahendra. He became the first Prime Minister following the two-year period of Mahendra's direct rule. He studied at the Suri Vidyasagar College, when it was affiliated with the University of Calcutta. He received a medical degree prior to entering politics.

Tulsi was married 3 times and had 2 sons and 4 daughters, as of 2005, to Sarah Giri, a deaf-rights advocate. As of 2013 they had been married 34 years. As an adult Tulsi was baptized to his wife's faith, Jehovah's Witnesses. He resigned as chairman Rastriya Panchayat in 1986 and moved to Sri Lanka where he stayed for two years and then finally settled in Bangalore, India until 2005. He died on December 18, 2018, at his home in Budhanilkantha, Kathmandu aged 92, from liver cancer.

References

1926 births
2018 deaths
Prime ministers of Nepal
Nepali Congress politicians from Madhesh Province
University of Calcutta alumni
Deaths from cancer in Nepal
Deaths from liver cancer
Nepalese Jehovah's Witnesses
Converts to Jehovah's Witnesses
Nepalese expatriates in Sri Lanka
Nepalese expatriates in India
People from Siraha District
Members of the Rastriya Panchayat
20th-century prime ministers of Nepal
Nepalese Hindus
Members of the National Assembly (Nepal)